Roller coaster amusement rides have origins back to ice slides constructed in 18th-century Russia. Early technology featured sleds or wheeled carts that were sent down hills of snow reinforced by wooden supports. The technology evolved in the 19th century to feature railroad track using wheeled cars that were securely locked to the track. Newer innovations emerged in the early 20th century with side friction and underfriction technologies to allow for greater speeds and sharper turns. By the mid-to-late 20th century, these elements intensified with the introduction of steel roller coaster designs and the ability to invert riders.

History

Beginnings
The world's oldest roller coasters descended from the "Russian Mountains", which were hills of ice built in the 17th century for the purpose of sliding, located in the gardens of palaces around the Russian capital, Saint Petersburg. Other languages also reference Russian mountains when referring to roller coasters, such as the Spanish (la montaña rusa), the Italian (montagne russe), and the French (les montagnes russes). The Russian term for roller coaster, американские горки (amerikanskie gorki), translates literally as "American mountains".

The recreational attractions were called Katalnaya Gorka (Катальная Горка) or "sliding mountain" in Russian. The slides became popular with the Russian upper class. Catherine the Great of Russia constructed a summer version of the ride at her estate in 1784, which relied on wheeled carts instead of sleds that rode along grooved tracks.

Russian soldiers occupying Paris from 1815 to 1816, after the defeat of Napoleon at Waterloo, may have introduced the Russian amusement of sledding down steep hills. In July 1817, a French banker named Nicolas Beaujon opened the Parc Beaujon, an amusement park on the Champs Elysees. Its most famous feature was the Promenades Aériennes or "Aerial Strolls." It featured wheeled cars securely locked to the track, guide rails to keep them on course, and higher speeds. The three-wheel carts were towed to the top of a tower, and then released to descend two curving tracks on either side. King Louis XVIII of France came to see the park, but it is not recorded if he tried the ride. Before long there were seven similar rides in Paris: Les Montagnes françaises (The French Mountains), le Delta, les Montagnes de Belleville (The Mountains of Belleville), les Montagnes américaines (the American Mountains), Les Montages lilliputiennes, (The miniature mountains), Les Montagnes suisses (The Swiss mountains), and Les Montagnes égyptiennes (The Egyptian mountains).

In the beginning, these attractions were primarily for the upper classes. In 1845 a new amusement park opened in Copenhagen, Tivoli, which was designed for the middle class. These new parks featured roller coasters as permanent attractions. The first permanent loop track was probably also built in Paris from an English design in 1846, with a single-person wheeled sled running through a 13-foot (4 m) diameter vertical loop. These early single loop designs were called Centrifugal Railways. In 1887, a French entrepreneur, Joseph Oller, the owner of the Moulin Rouge music hall, built Les Montagnes Russes à Belleville (The Russian Mountains of Belleville) a permanent roller coaster with a length of two hundred meters in the form of a double-eight, later enlarged to four figure-eight-shaped loops.

Scenic railways

In the 1850s, a mining company in Summit Hill, Pennsylvania, constructed the Mauch Chunk gravity railroad, a brakeman-controlled, 8.7-mile (14 km) downhill track used to deliver coal to Mauch Chunk (now known as Jim Thorpe), Pennsylvania. By 1872, the "Gravity Road" (as it became known) was selling rides to thrill seekers. Railway companies used similar tracks to provide amusement on days when ridership was low.

Using this idea as a basis, LaMarcus Adna Thompson began work on a gravity Switchback Railway that opened at Coney Island in Brooklyn, New York in 1884. Passengers climbed to the top of a platform and rode a bench-like car down the  track up to the top of another tower where the vehicle was switched to a return track and the passengers took the return trip. This track design was soon replaced with an oval complete circuit. In 1885, Phillip Hinkle introduced the first complete-circuit coaster with a lift hill, the Gravity Pleasure Road, which became the most popular attraction at Coney Island. Not to be outdone, in 1886 LaMarcus Adna Thompson patented his design for a roller coaster that included dark tunnels with painted scenery. "Scenic Railways" were soon found in amusement parks across the county, with Frederick Ingersoll's construction company building many of them in the first two decades of the 20th century.

Growing popularity and innovations

As it grew in popularity, experimentation in coaster dynamics took off. In the 1880s the concept of a vertical loop was again explored by Lina Beecher, and in 1895 the concept came into fruition with the Flip Flap Railway, located at Sea Lion Park in Brooklyn, and shortly afterward with Loop the Loop at Olentangy Park near Columbus, Ohio as well as similar coasters in Atlantic City and Coney Island. The rides were incredibly dangerous, and many passengers suffered whiplash. Both were soon dismantled, and looping coasters had to wait for over a half century before making a reappearance.

By 1919, the first underfriction roller coaster had been developed by John Miller. Soon, roller coasters spread to amusement parks all around the world. Perhaps the best known historical roller coaster, The Cyclone, was opened at Coney Island in 1927. Like The Cyclone, all early roller coasters were made of wood. Many old wooden roller coasters are still operational, at parks such as Kennywood near Pittsburgh, Pennsylvania and Pleasure Beach Blackpool. The oldest operating roller coaster is Leap-The-Dips at Lakemont Park in Pennsylvania, a side friction roller coaster built in 1902. The oldest wooden roller coaster in the United Kingdom is the Scenic Railway at Dreamland Amusement Park in Margate, Kent and features a system where the brakeman rides the car with wheels. It was severely damaged by fire on April 7, 2008, but was subsequently restored and reopened to the public in 2015. Scenic Railway at Melbourne's Luna Park built in 1912, is the world's oldest continually-operating roller coaster, and it also still features a system where the brakeman rides the car with wheels. One of only 13 remaining examples of John Miller's work worldwide is the wooden roller coaster at Lagoon in Utah. The coaster opened in 1921 and is the 6th oldest coaster in the world.

The Great Depression marked the end of the golden age of roller coasters, as amusement parks generally went into a decline that resulted in less demand for new coasters. This lasted until 1972, when The Racer opened at Kings Island amusement park located in what was then a part of Deerfield Township in Warren County, Ohio. Designed by John C. Allen, the instant success of The Racer helped to ignite a renaissance for roller coasters, reviving worldwide interest throughout the industry.

The rise of steel

In 1959, the Disneyland theme park introduced a new design breakthrough in roller coasters with the Matterhorn Bobsleds. This was the first roller coaster to use a tubular steel track. Unlike conventional wooden rails, which are generally formed using steel strips mounted on laminated wood, tubular steel can be bent in any direction, which allows designers to incorporate loops, corkscrews, and many other maneuvers into their designs. Most modern roller coasters are made of steel, although wooden roller coasters are still being built along with hybrids of steel and wood.

In 1975 the first modern-day roller coaster to perform an inverting element opened: Corkscrew, located at Knott's Berry Farm in Buena Park, California. In 1976 the vertical loop made a permanent comeback with the Great American Revolution at Magic Mountain in Valencia, California.

Timeline of notable roller coasters

The roller coasters mentioned here are significant for their role in the amusement industry. They were notable for specific reasons, including:
 First roller coaster of a specific kind, style, manufacturing material or unique technology; ground-breaking
 First time a particular record-breaking threshold was crossed
 Historical significance

18th century

1784
Russian Empress Catherine the Great builds a summer version of the "Russian mountain" slide, featuring sleds with wheels, at her estate in Oranienbaum, Russia near St. Petersburg.

1800 to 1899

1817 
First roller coaster featuring cars that locked onto track: Les Montagnes Russes à Belleville (Russian Mountains of Belleville), Paris, France.
First roller coaster to feature two cars racing each other: Les Montagnes Russes à Belleville.
First complete-circuit roller coaster: Promenades Aériennes (The Aerial Walk), Paris.
First roller coaster: Cat Magic Brittain

1827 
First scenic gravity railroad (inspiration for first American roller coasters): Mauch Chunk Switchback Gravity Railroad, Jim Thorpe, Pennsylvania, United States.

1846 
First looping roller coaster (non-circuit): Centrifugal Railway, Frascati Garden, Paris.

1885 
First use of powered chainlift: Gravity Pleasure, Coney Island, Brooklyn, New York.

1900 to 1970

1902 
Leap-The-Dips opens at Lakemont Park, Altoona, Pennsylvania. It is today the world's oldest operating wooden roller coaster (it was closed from 1985 until 1999).
Cannon Coaster opens at Coney Island. The designer first attempts to "leap-the-gap" and create a roller coaster which has its cars jump over a gap in the track. Safety testing fails, and the idea is scrapped.

1907 
First use of lap bar: Drop the Dip, Coney Island.

1909 
Virginia Reel at Luna Park, Coney Island opens as the world's first spinning roller coaster.

1912 

Scenic Railway opens at Luna Park, Melbourne, Victoria, Australia. Today it is the world's oldest continually-operating roller coaster.

1913 
First roller coaster with a Möbius-style track: Derby Racer, Euclid Beach Park, Cleveland, Ohio, United States.

1920 
First roller coaster to utilize up-stop wheels: Jack Rabbit, SeaBreeze, Rochester, New York, United States.

1925 
First roller coaster to reach 100 feet: Cyclone, Revere Beach, Revere, Massachusetts, United States.

1928 
Montaña Suiza opens at Parque de Atracciones Monte Igueldo, at San Sebastián, Guipúzcoa, Basque Country, Spain. It is the world's oldest operating steel roller coaster.

1929 
First ever roller coaster to utilize a bobsled-like design; Flying Turns, Lakeside Park, Dayton, Ohio, United States.

1951 

The Vuoristorata roller coaster at Linnanmäki amusement park in Helsinki, Finland is the oldest wooden roller coaster in the country; since its opening, it is still in operation.

1952 
First junior steel roller coaster: Little Dipper, Memphis Kiddie Park, Brooklyn, Ohio, United States. It is the world's oldest operating junior steel roller coaster.

1959 
First tubular steel roller coaster: Matterhorn Bobsleds, Disneyland, Anaheim, California, United States. Today it is the world's oldest operating tubular steel roller coaster.

1966 
First roller coaster to feature an underwater tunnel: Mine Train, Six Flags Over Texas.

1970s

1972 
First enclosed roller coaster: Fire In The Hole, Silver Dollar City, Branson, Missouri, United States.

1975 
First "modern" roller coaster with inversions (two): Corkscrew, Knott's Berry Farm, Buena Park, California.

1976 
First "modern" roller coaster with a vertical loop: Revolution, Six Flags Magic Mountain, Valencia, California.
First roller coaster with three inversions: Corkscrew, Cedar Point, Sandusky, Ohio, United States.

1977 
First shuttle roller coaster: although six opened the same year, White Lightnin' - Carowinds (Charlotte, North Carolina, United States) White Lightnin''', at Carowinds, is likely to have opened first, given the park's southern location and longer operating season.

 1978 
First roller coaster with interlocking loops: Loch Ness Monster, Busch Gardens Williamsburg, Williamsburg, Virginia, United States
First roller coaster to feature a flywheel launch system, as well as tallest roller coaster on opening day: Montezooma's Revenge at Knott's Berry Farm, Buena Park, California, United States.

 1979 
The Beast: opened as the tallest, fastest and longest wooden roller coaster. Today it's still the longest wooden roller coaster in the world.

1980s

 1980 
First roller coaster with four inversions: Carolina Cyclone, Carowinds, North Carolina and South Carolina, United States.

 1981 
First roller coaster manufactured by Vekoma: Python, Efteling, Kaatsheuvel, Netherlands.
First modern suspended roller coaster: The Bat, Kings Island, Mason, Ohio, United States.

 1982 
First roller coaster with five inversions: Viper, Darien Lake, Darien, New York.
First roller coaster to operate vehicles in reverse: Racer, Kings Island.
First roller coaster to run stand-up trains: Dangai, Thrill Valley, Gotemba, Shizuoka, Japan.

 1983 
First alpine roller coaster: Ice Mountain Bobsleds, Enchanted Forest, Turner, Oregon, United States.
First roller coaster to exceed ; Moonsault Scramble, Fuji-Q Highland, Japan.
Most G-force ever exceeded on a roller coaster (6.2 G's);Moonsault Scramble.

 1984 
First Boomerang roller coaster: "Boomerang", Bellewaerde Park, Belgium (it was the second to be built, but the first to open to the public.)
First steel bobsled coaster; Sarajevo Bobsleds, Six Flags Magic Mountain, Valencia, California, United States

 1985 
First roller coaster with a heartline roll: Ultra Twister, Nagashima Spa Land, Mie Prefecture, Japan.
First successful pipeline coaster; Ultra TwisterFirst wooden roller coaster relocation; Phoenix, Knoebels Amusement Resort, Elysburg, Pennsylvania, United States.

 1987 
First roller coaster with six inversions: Vortex, Kings Island.

 1988 
First roller coaster with seven inversions: Shockwave, Six Flags Great America, Gurnee, Illinois, United States.

 1989 
First complete-circuit roller coaster to exceed  in height: Magnum XL-200, Cedar Point.

1990s

 1990 
First roller coaster designed by Bolliger & Mabillard: Iron Wolf, Six Flags Great America, Gurnee, Illinois, United States.

 1992 

First inverted roller coaster: Batman: The Ride, Six Flags Great America.
First roller coaster with a cutback inversion: Drachen Fire, Busch Gardens Williamsburg, Williamsburg, Virginia, United States.

 1995 
First roller coaster with eight inversions: Dragon Khan, PortAventura Park, Salou and Vilaseca, Tarragona, Spain.
First use of on-board audio: Space Mountain, Disneyland Park, Paris.

 1996 
First roller coasters to use a linear motor electromagnetic propulsion system: Flight of Fear, at both Kings Island and Kings Dominion.

 1997 
First roller coaster to reach : Tower of Terror II, Dreamworld, Australia.
First flying roller coaster: Skytrak Total, Granada Studios, Manchester, United Kingdom.

 1998 

First dive coaster: Oblivion, Alton Towers, Alton, Staffordshire, United Kingdom.
First linear motor launched inverted roller coaster: Volcano, The Blast Coaster, Kings Dominion.
First linear motor launched dueling roller coaster: Batman & Robin: The Chiller, Six Flags Great Adventure, Jackson Township, New Jersey, United States.

 1999 
First floorless roller coaster: Medusa, Six Flags Great Adventure.
First tire-propelled launch system: The Incredible Hulk, Universal's Islands of Adventure, Orlando, Florida, United States.
First inverted dueling roller coaster: Dragon Challenge, Universal's Islands of Adventure.

2000s

 2000 

First complete-circuit roller coaster to exceed  in height: Millennium Force, Cedar Point.
First roller coaster to use an elevator cable lift system: Millennium Force.
First modern wooden roller coaster with a vertical loop: "Son of Beast", Kings Island. (Note: after an accident on July 9, 2006 the loop was removed.)
First wooden roller coaster over 200 feet (60.96 m) tall: Son of Beast.
First large-scale flying roller coaster, Nighthawk, California's Great America, now at Carowinds
First interactive water coaster; Flying Super Saturator, Carowinds, United States.

 2001 
First roller coaster with a 90° vertical drop* and fastest roller coaster acceleration: Dodonpa, Fuji-Q Highland, Fujiyoshida, Yamanashi, Japan. (*Note: it was changed for a vertical loop in 2017)
First roller coaster to use pneumatic propulsion system: Hypersonic XLC, Kings Dominion.
First roller coaster to feature both a lift hill and propulsion system: California Screamin', Disney California Adventure Park, Anaheim, California, United States.

 2002 
First roller coaster to use a hydraulic propulsion system: Xcelerator, Knott's Berry Farm.
First roller coaster with ten inversions: Colossus, Thorpe Park, Chertsey, Surrey, United Kingdom.
First roller coaster with seats that rotate on a horizontal axis (4th dimension roller coaster): X², Six Flags Magic Mountain.

 2003 
First complete-circuit roller coaster to exceed  in height: Top Thrill Dragster, Cedar Point.
First roller coaster with a more than 90° vertical drop (97°): Vild-Svinet, BonBon-Land, Zealand, Denmark.
First roller coaster to utilize a vertical lift (not considered an elevator lift): Vild-Svinet, BonBon-Land.

 2004 
First coaster with a "fly-through" station: Thunderhead, Dollywood, Pigeon Forge, Tennessee, United States.

 2005 Kingda Ka opens as the tallest roller coaster in the world.

 2006 Expedition Everest opened at Disney's Animal Kingdom. At $100 million, was listed in the 2011 Guinness Book of World Records as the most expensive roller coaster in the world.  The record was broken in 2019 by Hagrid's Magical Creatures Motorbike Adventure at a record $300 million.

 2007 
First wing roller coaster: Furius Baco, PortAventura Park, Salou and Vilaseca, Tarragona, Catalonia, Spain

 2008 
First roller coaster with a "ferris wheel"-style lift hill: Maximum RPM!, Freestyle Music Park, Myrtle Beach, South Carolina, United States.

 2009 
First roller coaster with a 100° free-fall drop: Saw: The Ride, Thorpe Park, Surrey, United Kingdom

2010s

 2010 
First roller coaster with a vertical freefall drop element: Th13teen, Alton Towers, Staffordshire, United KingdomFormula Rossa opens as the fastest roller coaster in the world.

 2011 
First Boomerang roller coaster without any inversions: Ben 10 – Ultimate Mission, Drayton Manor Theme Park, Tamworth, Staffordshire, EnglandTakabisha, Fuji-Q Highland, Fujiyoshida, Yamanashi, Japan opens as the roller coaster with a steepest drop in the world (121°).
First wooden coaster with steel hybrid conversion; New Texas Giant, Six Flags Over Texas, Arlington, Texas, United States.

 2013 
First wooden roller coaster with three inversions: Outlaw Run, Silver Dollar City, Branson, Missouri, United States.
First roller coaster with 14 inversions: The Smiler, Alton Towers, Staffordshire, United Kingdom.
Roller coaster with the highest inversion in the world: GateKeeper, Cedar Point, Sandusky, Ohio 

 2014 
Fastest wooden roller coaster with the longest and steepest drop: Goliath, Six Flags Great America, Gurnee, Illinois.

 2015 
Tallest and fastest giga coaster: Fury 325, Carowinds, United States.
First wooden shuttle coaster; Switchback, ZDT's Amusement Park, United States.

 2016 
First launched wooden coaster: Lightning Rod'', Dollywood, Pigeon Forge, Tennessee, United States.

2018 
First single rail coasters: Wonder Woman Golden Lasso Coaster, Six Flags Fiesta Texas, San Antonio, Texas and RailBlazer, California's Great America, Santa Clara, California.
First hyper-hybrid roller coaster: Steel Vengeance, Cedar Point, Sandusky, Ohio

See also
 Roller coaster elements
 List of roller coaster rankings
 Physics of roller coasters

References

External links
 Roller Coaster History - History of the roller coaster
 Roller Coaster Patents - With links to the U.S. Patent office
 Roller Coaster Database - Information, statistics and photos for over 1900 roller coasters throughout the world

Amusement rides based on rail transport
Roller coaster